Dom is a Trans–New Guinea language of the Eastern Group of the Chimbu family, spoken in the Gumine and Sinasina Districts of Chimbu Province and in some other isolated settlements in the western highlands of Papua New Guinea.

Sociolinguistic Background

The Dom people live in an agricultural society, which has a tribal, patrilocal and patrilineal  organization. There is only small dialectal differentiation among the clans. The predominant religion is Christianity.

Language Contact Situation

There are three different languages spoken by Dom speakers alongside Dom: Tok Pisin,  Kuman and English. Tok Pisin serves as the Papuan lingua franca. Kuman, which is a closely related eastern Chimbu language of high social and cultural prestige, functions as the prestige language used in ceremonies and official situations. School lessons are mostly hold in English.

Grammar

Phonology

Vowels

iu
eo
aa:

Minimal pairs

Allophones
Vowel lengthening in a contour pitched syllable has allophonic character.

Vowel Sequences
uo
o
a:

Consonants 
The Dom consonant system consists of 13 indigenous and 3 loan consonants.

The phonemes /c/[ts], /j/[ndʒ]and /ʟ/[ʟ] are loan phonemes and unstable in use.

Minimal pairs

˩˥su 'two'  ~ ˩˥tu 'thick'
~ ˩˥du 'squeeze'
~ ˩˥nu 'aim at'
~ ˩˥ku 'hold in the mouth'
~ ˩˥gu 'shave'
~ ˩˥pu 'blow'
~ ˩˥mu 'his/her back'
~ ˩˥yu 'harvest taro'

Allophones

Variants can be determined by the factors of dialect or age. Certain exceptions show archaic variants, for example the existence of intervocal [b] in the word ˥˩iba 'but' or the otherwise non-existent sequence [lk], which is used only by elderly people or in official situations. Brackets "()" show, that the allophone is used only in loanwords.

Tones 
Dom is a tonal language. Each word carries one of three tones as shown in the examples below:

high:
ka˥ 'word'
 mu˥kal˥ 'a kind of bamboo'
 no˥ma˥ne˥ 'to think'
falling:
ŋgal˥˩ 'string back'
 jo˥pa˩ ' yopa tree', jo˥pal˥˩ 'people'
a˥ra˥wa˩ 'pumpkin'
rising:
 kal˩˥ 'thing'
 a˩pal˧ 'woman'
 au˩pa˩le˧ 'sister.3Sg.POSS'

Minimal pairs

wam˥˩ (personal name) ~ wam˩ 'to hitch.3SG' ~ wam˥ 'son3SG.POSS'

Non-phonemic Elements

[ɨ] is optionally inserted between consonants:

˥˩komna 'vegetable' kom˥ na˩ or kom˥ ɨ na˩

Morphology
Dom is a suffixing language. Morpheme boundaries between person-number and mood morphemes can be combined.

Syntax

Phrase Structure
Noun Phrase

elements preceding the head:
 attributive NP

possessive marker

relative clause 

noun classifier

elements following the head:
numerals

adjectives

appositions

demonstratives

If a noun phrase includes a demonstrative element, it has always the last position of the phrase:

Adjective Phrase

Postpositional Phrase

Verbal Phrase

elements preceding the head verb:

 subject:

 subject-object:

 adverbial

 final clause

elements following the head verb:

 auxiliars:

 mutual knowledge marker

 demonstratives

There are no zero-place predicates in Dom. As a subject ˩˥kamn 'world' is used:

Constituent Order 
The predominant constituent order is ‘’’S-O-V’’’. Only the predicate has to be expressed overtly. An exception are absolute-topic type clauses, which consist only of one noun phrase.

Characteristics of the constituent order
 Three Place Predicate Order

In the case of a three place predicate the recipient noun always follows the gift noun:

The only position which can be optionally filled is the sentence topic. Possible constituents can be the subject of an equational sentence (default), an extrasentential or a topicalized constituent:

subject in an equational sentence (default)

extrasentential:

topicalized constituent:

Marking of Syntactical Relations

Person and Number 
Dom has three different person-number-systems: for pronouns, possessive suffixes on nouns and cross reference markers on verbs.

The marking of dual and plural is not obligatory in all cases but depends on the sem ±human ±animate:

Tense 
Dom has an unmarked non-future tense and a marked future tense.

Non-Future
Non-future tense is used, if
the event follows immediately
the event is in the past

Future tense
Future tense is marked by the suffix -na (-na~-ra~-a) and is used, if
the event is part of the speaker's plan for the next day
the event is the speaker's intention and it is possible for the speaker to go through with it
the event describes a potentiality or a permanent quality

Negation

A predicate is negated by the suffix -kl. The preceding negation particle ˥ta is optional.

Lexic

Noun Classifiers 
Noun classifiers are lexical items preceding a noun with a more specified meaning. Phonetically and syntactically they form one unit with the following noun and thus differ from an apposition, which consists of two or more phonetic constituents.
Noun classifiers can have the following functions:

no obvious lexical specification:

specifying a polysemoous word:

explaining loanwords:

Repetition 

A noun can be repeated to express the following relations:

reciprocity

plurality

Loanwords

Tok Pisin is the main source for lexical borrowing, borrowings from English are often made indirectly via Tok Pisin. Borrowed lexemes mostly refer to new cultural objects and concepts as well as proper names and high numbers., which did not exist in the Dom language before: 
 kar ’car’
 skul 'school, to study'
 akn 'Mount Hagen'
 andret 'hundred'
But recently some already existing Dom words have begun to be replaced by Tok Pisin lexical items:
 wanpla for dom tenanta 'one'
 blat for dom miam 'blood'
 stori for dom kapore-el- 'to tell a story'

The Demonstrative System 

Dom has a spatial referencing demonstrative system, i.e. there are certain demonstrative lexemes bearing information about the spatial relation of the referred object to the speaker alongside neutral demonstratives. A Dom speaker also uses different lexemes for visible and invisible objects. In the case of visible objects, the speaker locates it on a horizontal and vertical axis as to whether it is proximal, medium or distal from the speaker and on the same level, uphill or downhill.

Demonstratives with spatial alignment:

For invisible objects one must be aware of the cause for its invisibility. If it is invisible because the object is behind the speaker, a proximal demonstrative is used. Objects obscured behind an obstacle are referred to with distal demonstratives and invisible objects by their nature with downhill demonstratives. Invisible objects, that are very far away, are referred to with the downhill distal demonstrative ˩˥ime.

References

Languages of Simbu Province
Languages of Western Highlands Province
Chimbu–Wahgi languages